Vernice Carlton Smith (born October 24, 1965) is a former American football guard in the National Football League for the Phoenix Cardinals, Chicago Bears, Washington Redskins, and the St. Louis Rams.  He played college football at Florida A&M University.

1965 births
Living people
American football offensive guards
Chicago Bears players
Florida A&M Rattlers football players
Players of American football from Orlando, Florida
Phoenix Cardinals players
St. Louis Rams players
Washington Redskins players